Anantakrishna Shahapur (1920-1998) popularly known as Satyakama was a Kannada writer, Indian freedom fighter and a journalist who was born on 2 March 1920 in Galagali village of Bagalkot district, Karnataka.

Literary works
 Tantrayoni
 Devana Innondu Baagilu
 Ashwaghosha
 Chanda Prachanda
 Kamana Billu
 Kaalinalli Kannirali
 Ardha Daari
 Krishnarpana
 Rhushi Panchami
 Vijnyana Bhairava
 Vichitra Veerya
 Rajabali
 Abhinava
 Aahuti
 Panchamagala Naduve
 Rajakreede
 Kapila Vastu
 Nagarananju
 Manemaru
 Benkiya Magalu
 Bendreyavara Kavyadalli Rasa Siddhi
 Swatantra
 Lavanya
 Manvantara
 Anantha Jeevana
 Mahaniyara Pouranika Kathegalu 
 Purushasookta
 Sringara Theertha
 Vi-Prayoga
 Matru Lahari Mattu Itara Kavitegalu
 Tannagina Benki
 Satyakaamara Kathegalu
 Bhruhaspati - Kannada Bharatha Bharathi - 101

Poetry collections
 Veene
 Matrumandira
 Matrulahari
 Gangalahari
 Shrungara Teertha
 Odeda Kannadi
 Manvantara

Story collections
 Haleya Rajakeeya
 Naayimoogu

Awards and honours
Karnataka Sahitya Academy Award
Rajyotsava Award

References

Kannada-language writers
1920 births
1998 deaths